The 2000 AIHL season was the inaugural season of the Australian Ice Hockey League (AIHL), the first semi-pro national ice hockey league in Australian history. The Sydney Bears finished first after the regular season but lost the championship final to the Adelaide Avalanche 5–6 in a shootout. Paul Lawson of the Adelaide Avalanche top scored in the regular season.

Regular season
The maiden regular season featured all three founding teams, Adelaide Avalanche, Canberra Knights and the Sydney Bears, playing in a round-robin format. The top two teams at the conclusion of the regular season would qualify to play a single head-to-head final.

Final 
Following the regular season the Avalanche and the Bears competed in the single game final held at Macquarie Ice Rink. Adelaide won the game 6-5 in a shootout after coming from two goals behind late in the third period to level the match in regulation time. The Bears controlled the match in the first two periods before a controversial five minute major penalty late in the game to the Bears saw Adelaide pull goaltender Eric Lien and score two power play goals.

References

2000 in ice hockey
2000 in Australian sport
Australian Ice Hockey League seasons